The horticulture industry embraces the production, processing and shipping of and the market for fruits and vegetables. As such it is a sector of agribusiness and industrialized agriculture. Industrialized horticulture sometimes also includes the floriculture industry and production and trade of ornamental plants.

Among the most important fruits are:
 bananas
 Semi-tropical fruits like lychee, guava or tamarillo
 Citrus fruits
 soft fruits (berries)
 Apples
 stone fruits

Important vegetables include:
 Potatoes
 Sweet potatoes
 Tomatoes
 Onions and
 Cabbage

Value chain
The horticultural value chain includes:
  Inputs: elements needed for production; seeds, fertilizers, agrochemicals, farm equipment, irrigation equipment, GMO technology
  Production for export: includes fruit and vegetables production and all processes related to growth and harvesting; planting, weeding, spraying, picking 
  Packing and cold storage: grading, washing, trimming, chopping, mixing, packing, labeling, blast chilling
  Processed fruit and vegetables: dried, frozen, preserved, juices, pulps; mostly for increasing shelf life
  Distribution and marketing: supermarkets, small scale retailers, wholesalers, food service

Companies

Fruit
Chiquita Brands International
Del Monte Foods
Dole Food Company

Genetically modified crops / GMO

Monsanto/Bayer

References

External links
FFA (future farmers of America)
http://www.fruitlogistica.de/ fruit logistica conference 2017

Agriculture
Horticulture
Intensive farming
Industries (economics)